The 2004 Mongolian National Championship was the thirty-seventh recorded edition of top flight football in Mongolia and the ninth season of the Mongolian Premier League, which took over as the highest level of competition in the country from the previous Mongolian National Championship. Khangarid from Erdenet were champions, their second title, Khoromkhon were  runners up, with Ordiin-Od in third place.

Participants
 Erchim
 Ordiin-Od
 Ulaanbaatar Mazaalai
 Ulaanbaatar United
 Khangarid
 Khoromkhon

Format
The competition was played in two stages: firstly a regular league competition. Following this, four of the six competing teams qualified for the semifinal playoffs, the winners of which advanced to a one off final, with the losers contesting a third place match.

Playoffs
Erchim and Mazalaai were eliminated in the regular stage, the other four participants proceeded to the playoff stage.

Bracket

Semi-finals

Third-place

Final

References

Mongolia Premier League seasons
Mongolia
Mongolia
football